Praso may refer to:

 Praso, Italy, populated place in Trentino in the northern Italian region Trentino-Alto Adige/Südtirol
 Praso (Echinades), islet east of Ithaca, one of the Ionian Islands in Greece
 Praso (Kissamos), islet close to the eastern coast of Crete
 Assin Praso, a town in the Assin North Municipal District of the Central Region in Ghana